This is a list of the area codes in the state of Illinois and the geographic area of each numbering plan area:

217/447: Central Illinois, and part of Southern Illinois running west from the Illinois-Indiana border through Danville, Effingham, Champaign–Urbana, Decatur, Springfield, Quincy until Illinois' western border with Missouri and Iowa.
309/861: Central-Western Illinois including Bloomington–Normal, Peoria, and all the way west to the Illinois part of the Quad Cities including Moline, and Rock Island.
312: Chicago, the central city area including the Chicago Loop and the Near North Side.
618: Southern Illinois, including Carbondale and most of the Metro East region of St. Louis suburbs in Illinois.
630/331: West suburbs of Chicago in DuPage County and Kane County including Wheaton, Naperville, and Aurora.  Area code 630 was overlaid with area code 331 in 2007.
708/464: South suburbs and inner west suburbs of Chicago, including the Chicago Southland and most west and south suburbs in Cook County including Melrose Park, Norridge, Oak Park, Oak Lawn, Chicago Heights, and Orland Park.
773: Chicago, covers most of the geographical area of Chicago except the downtown Chicago Loop, which is in area code 312. 
815/779: Northern Illinois outside of the immediate Chicago area including Joliet, Kankakee, LaSalle, DeKalb, and Rockford.  Area code 815 was overlaid with area code 779 in 2007.
847/224: North and northwest suburbs of Chicago including all of Lake County, part of McHenry County, northern Cook County, and northeastern Kane County.  This area includes Evanston, Des Plaines, Waukegan, and most of Elgin.  Area code 847 was overlaid with area code 224 in 2002.
872: City of Chicago, overlaying area codes 312 and 773.

History
In the group of original North American area codes, established in 1947, all of the Chicago metropolitan area was part of the 312 numbering plan area, the rest of northern Illinois was 815, central Illinois was 217, and southern Illinois was 618. In 1957, area code 815 was split for the assignment of area code 309 to western central Illinois. No further changes took place for 33 years.

In 1989, area code 708 was created for all of the suburbs in the Chicago metropolitan area while the city of Chicago kept the original 312. Area codes 847 (northern suburbs) and 630 (western suburbs) were created from a split of suburban area code 708 in 1996. Shortly after in 1996, area code 773 was created for the residential parts of the city of Chicago, while downtown kept area code 312. Area code 847 exhausted its numbers quickly, so that an overlay area code, 224, was implemented in 1996 for relief. However, mandatory ten-digit dialing was not in effect until 2002. In March 2007, an overlay plan was created for NPA 630 adding area code 331, and 779 was added to 815. With the depletion of new numbers in area codes 312 and 773, an overlay of both of them, area code 872, was created in November 2009, beginning ten-digit dialing within the city limits of Chicago. The remaining area without an overlay in the northern part of Illinois, 708, eventually received such with area code 464 taking effect on January 21, 2022.

Downstate, no changes took place from 1957 until 2021, when area code 447 was implemented as an overlay for 217 and mandating ten-digit dialing there. The remainder of the state switched to ten-digit dialing as well in October 2021 as a result of the implementation of the 988 Suicide & Crisis Lifeline. Both 309 and 618 are currently projected to exhaust in the next few years; area code 861 will go into effect on February 24, 2023, as an overlay of 309, and area code 730 will go into effect on July 7, 2023, as an overlay of 618. After such implementation, the entire state will be composed of overlay regions.

See also
List of North American Numbering Plan area codes
North American Numbering Plan

References

External links

 
Area Codes
Illinois